WCAI (90.1 FM) in Woods Hole, Massachusetts, WNAN (91.1 FM) in Nantucket, and WZAI (94.3 FM) in Brewster, are National Public Radio member radio stations serving the Cape Cod and Islands area of southeast Massachusetts. They broadcast primarily news and information programming and are owned by the WGBH Educational Foundation in Boston. WCAI's studios are located at 3 Water Street in Woods Hole, Massachusetts (a census-designated place in Falmouth) and its transmission facilities are located in Tisbury, Massachusetts.

The station was founded by independent radio producer Jay Allison and his organization, Atlantic Public Media, with construction and operation duties assigned to WGBH, and first went on the air in 2000; Atlantic Public Media has also produced local programming for the station. (WNAN went on the air on March 15, 2000) Coverage for WCAI and WNAN didn't reach all of Cape Cod and the nearby islands, however, and in 2005 the third signal, WZAI, went on the air. In addition, an online stream of the station is available.

In 2007, the station won the prestigious Alfred I. duPont-Columbia Award, often called the Pulitzer Prize of broadcast journalism, for a 20-part series called "Two Cape Cods: Hidden Poverty on the Cape and Islands". The series was produced and reported by Sean Corcoran, and it highlighted numerous poverty issues in a region that often is thought of as playground for the rich. WCAI was the only radio station to win the award that year.

In 2020, the station rebranded as CAI, as part of a larger rebranding underwent by WGBH (which similarly dropped "W" from its branding organization-wide).

Apart from being owned by WGBH, there is no connection between the Cape and Islands NPR stations and WNCK in Nantucket, which formerly simulcast WGBH's primary radio service and later WCRB, a classical music station owned by WGBH. WCAI itself carries WCRB's programming on its second HD Radio channel, which was added in late 2013 after WCAI boosted its power.

Simulcasts

References

External links 
 
 Website of founding organization Atlantic Public Media
 Interview with Jay Allison on the podcast and public radio interview program ThoughtCast

CAI
NPR member stations
CAI
WGBH Educational Foundation
Radio stations established in 2000
Falmouth, Massachusetts
News and talk radio stations in the United States